DreamHack Winter 2014 was the fourth Counter-Strike: Global Offensive Major Championship, held from November 27–29, 2014 at Elmia in Jönköping. It was organized by DreamHack and sponsored by Valve. The tournament had a total prize pool of US$250,000. The eight quarter-finalists from the previous Major, ESL One Cologne 2014 received direct invitations, while qualifiers were held for the remaining spots.

Team LDLC was the winner of the event after beating Ninjas in Pyjamas 2-1 in the finals.

Format
The top eight teams from ESL One Cologne 2014 ("Legends") received direct invitations to DreamHack Winter 2014. Two of these invitations were rescinded after a cheating scandal, leaving ten spots (the "Challengers") to be filled by a mixtures of qualifiers and invites. Five teams from Europe, one team from North America, and two teams from a "Last Call LAN Qualifier" qualified for the tournament. After the scheduled qualifiers were completed, two teams were directly invited to the Major to fill the final two spots.

Teams were split up into four groups, and all group matches were best-of-ones. The highest seed would play the lowest seed in each group and the second and third seeds would play against each other. The winner of those two matches would play each other to determine which team moved on to the playoff stage, while the losers of the first round of matches also played. The loser of the lower match was then eliminated from the tournament. With one team advanced and one eliminated, the two remaining teams would play an elimination match for the second playoff spot. This format is known as the GSL format, named for the Global StarCraft II League.

The playoffs bracket consisted of eight teams, two from each group. All of these matches were best-of-three, single elimination. Teams advanced in the bracket until a winner was decided.

Map pool
The seven-map pool did not change from ESL One Cologne 2014. Before each match in the group stage, both teams banned two maps. The map for the match was then randomly selected from the remaining three maps. In the playoffs, each team first banned one map, then chose one map. The two chosen maps were the first two maps in the best-of-three. If the series were to require a third map, the map was randomly selected from the three remaining maps.

Regional qualifiers

European Closed Qualifier

North America Closed Qualifier

Last Call LAN Qualifier

Broadcast talent
Host
 Scott "SirScoots" Smith

Stage Host
 James Duffield

Analyst
 Duncan "Thorin" Shields

Commentators
 Auguste "Semmler" Massonnat
 Anders Blume
 Robin "Fifflaren" Johansson
 Stuart "TosspoT" Saw

Teams
The most notable pre-Major team change came after a cheating scandal involving three French players. Two teams that achieved Legends status at the previous Major were dropped from their Legends spots. Titan, whose roster achieved Legends status as Team LDLC.com, was disqualified from the tournament after Hovik "KQLY" Tovmassian was caught cheating. At the same time, Epsilon eSports was disqualified after Gordon "Sf" Giry was found to be cheating. The two players and Simon "smn" Beck were then VAC banned by Valve and were permanently banned from any Valve-sponsored tournaments, including Majors. Titan and Epsilons' spots were then filled by Copenhagen Wolves and Flipsid3 Tactics, teams advancing from a new qualifier.

Group stage

Group A

Group B

Group C

Group D

Playoffs

Bracket

Quarterfinals scores

HellRaisers vs. Ninjas in Pyjamas
Casters: Anders Blume & Semmler

Virtus.pro vs. PENTA Sports
Casters: TosspoT & Fifflaren

Team LDLC.com vs. Fnatic
Casters: Anders Blume & Semmler

Team Dignitas vs. Natus Vincere
Casters: TosspoT & Fifflaren

Semifinals scores

Ninjas in Pyjamas vs. Virtus.pro
Casters: TosspoT vs. Fifflaren

Team LDLC.com vs. Natus Vincere
Casters: Anders Blume & Semmler

Finals scores
NiP was the defending Major champions and was also making its fourth straight Major final appearance. Team LDLC.com became the first French team to appear in a CS:GO Major final.

Casters: Anders Blume & Semmler

Final standings

References

External links
 Official webpage

2014 in Sweden
2014 in esports
DreamHack events